Athenodorus (Greek: Ἀθηνόδωρος), also known as Athenogenes (Greek: Ἀθηνογένης), (? – 148) was Bishop of Byzantium from 144 until 148. During his years of office,   when the city was administrated by Zeuxippus, there was a significant increase in the Christian population. Athenodorus commissioned the construction of a second cathedral in Elaea, which was later renovated by Emperor Constantine I, who wanted to be buried there. Eventually, he was not buried there, as it was deemed improper for Emperors to be buried outside Byzantium. The cathedral was devoted to the martyrdoms of Eleazar and of the seven children in 2 Maccabees.

References 

2nd-century Romans
2nd-century Byzantine bishops
Bishops of Byzantium